Adelbert David Bishop (March 15, 1942 – July 8, 2017) was a Canadian politician. He served in the Legislative Assembly of New Brunswick from 1974 to 1987, as a Progressive Conservative member for the constituency of York North. He died in 2017.

References

1942 births
2017 deaths
Progressive Conservative Party of New Brunswick MLAs
People from Woodstock, New Brunswick